Fast Ball Anderson was an American baseball pitcher in the Negro leagues. He played with the Indianapolis ABCs in 1938.

References

External links
 and Baseball-Reference Black Baseball Stats and  Seamheads 

Indianapolis ABCs (1938) players
Year of birth missing
Year of death missing
Baseball pitchers